Help Wanted is the debut solo album release from former Jane's Addiction bassist, Eric Avery, released on April 8, 2008.

A number of notable guest musicians perform on the record, including Foo Fighters' Taylor Hawkins, Garbage's Shirley Manson, and Red Hot Chili Peppers bassist and trumpeter Flea and trumpeter Willie Waldman.  Harold Barefoot Sanders III, who collaborated with Eric in his band Polar Bear, also contributes on a few tracks.  Lastly, Chris Chaney, current bassist of Jane's Addiction, plays on a song along with his bandmate of The Coattail Riders.

A music video was created for the song "All Remote And No Control" which can be viewed at IGN.

Fishpork ranked it #5 of the year for 2008.

Track listing

"Belly of an Insect" – 4:24
"Beside the Fire" – 3:32
"All Remote and No Control" – 4:03
"Revolution" – 4:22
"Maybe" – 4:26
"Unexploded" – 3:55
"Walk through Walls (The Man Who Can Fly Pt. 5)" – 4:37
"Philo Beddoe" – 4:09
"Chicken Bone (The Man Who Can Fly Pt. 2)" – 3:40
"Porchlight" – 3:48
"Song in the Silence (The Man Who Can Fly Pt. 7)" – 4:35
"Sun’s Gone" – 4:28

Personnel

Jason Orme – guitar (1, 9)
Chris McClure – guitar (2), backing vocal (4)
Christian Stone – guitar (2)
Eamon Ryland – guitar (2)
David Levita – guitar (3, 5, 7, 10, 11), Marxophone (7)
Mark Pritchard – guitar (8)
Zane Smythe – guitar (11)
Harold Barefoot Sanders III – synthesizer (3), drum sampling, bits and synth (12)
Jonathan Larroquette – synthesizer (6)
Adam Somers – modular synthesizer (6)
Zac Rae – keyboards (7, 11), Wurly (10)
Taylor Hawkins – drums (1, 3, 6–8)
Matt Tecu – drums (10, 11)
Kirsten Gottschalk – backing vocal (3)
Shirley Manson – lyric co-writing and vocal (5)
Chris Chaney – bass (7)
Flea – main horn (11)
Willie Waldman – outro horn (11)

References

2008 albums